Aegerosphecia is a genus of moths in the family Sesiidae.

Species
Aegerosphecia calliptera Le Cerf, 1916
Aegerosphecia cyanea Hampson, 1919
Aegerosphecia fasciata (Walker, 1862)
Aegerosphecia fulviventris Le Cerf, 1916
Aegerosphecia fumoptera Kallies & Arita, 2004a
Aegerosphecia myanmarensis Kallies & Arita, 2004
Aegerosphecia mysolica (Walker, [1865])

References

Sesiidae
Taxa named by Ferdinand Le Cerf
Moth genera